MLR Institute of Pharmacy is located at Dundigal, Hyderabad, Andhra Pradesh. The institution was started in 2005 by the KMR Education Trust, headed by Marri Laxma Reddy. The institute is under MLR Institute of technology, which has six UG courses along with two PG courses.

Every semester has a minimum of nine courses, which includes a minimum of four laboratory courses and five theory courses. Students are required to attain a total of 212 credits and attend the institute for duration of not less than four years and not more than eight years to be considered for the award of the degree. The institute follows JNTU’s strict attendance regulation, which requires students to put in a minimum class attendance of 65% to progress to the next semester. External (university) exams are held every semester in the campus and consolidated results in all these exams count towards the final aggregate grading.

Admissions 
The minimum criterion for admission is 60% marks in the intermediate/10+2 examination. Students are admitted primarily based on their ranks in the Engineering Agricultural and Medical Common Entrance Test EAMCET, held by the Jawaharlal Nehru Technological University, Hyderabad every year.

References

External links 
 

Universities and colleges in Hyderabad, India
Pharmacy schools in India
2005 establishments in Andhra Pradesh